Vaseux Lake Provincial Park is a provincial park located along the northeastern shore of Vaseux Lake in the Okanagan region of British Columbia, Canada. The park plays a key role in educating and providing access to important conservation values and has a responsibility to maintain these activities.

See also
Vaseux Protected Area
Vaseux-Bighorn National Wildlife Area

References

Provincial parks of British Columbia
Provincial parks in the Okanagan
Regional District of Okanagan-Similkameen